Elisabeth Lardelli (born as von Waldkirch on 21 February 1921 in Bern; died 9 March 2008 in Chur; originally from Poschiavo) was a politician of the Swiss People's Party. She was a National Councillor for the canton of Grisons from 1974 to 1975.

Life and career
She was the daughter of the Republican lawyer and politician .

After she earned her Matura in Bern, Lardelli studied law at the University of Bern from 1941 to 1947 and obtained the advocate patent in Bern. After she moved to Chur in the canton of Grisons in 1950, she was the first woman to earn the lawyer patent in the canton of Grisons.

From 1955 to 1985, Lardelli headed the legal advice service of the Grisons Women's Associations Liaison Centre. Besides, she taught law in several schools.

From 1973 to 1979, Lardelli was a member of the Grand Council of Grisons for the Swiss People's Party. In 1974, she joined the National Council as a replacement for Leon Schlumpf who had been elected to the Council of States. Thereby she became the first female National Councillor from the canton of Grisons. She sat in the National Council until 1975. From 1977 to 1980, Lardelli was the chairwoman of the Swiss Organisation of Female Academics. Lardelli campaigned for women's suffrage and for gender equality, as well as for new children's rights and marriage law.

She was married with lawyer Albert Lardelli and had three children.

See also
List of members of the Federal Assembly from the Canton of Grisons

References

Bibliography

External links

20th-century Swiss women
20th-century Swiss women politicians
20th-century Swiss politicians
20th-century Swiss lawyers
Swiss women lawyers
Swiss suffragists
Swiss People's Party politicians
Women members of the National Council (Switzerland)
University of Bern alumni
People from Bern
People from Poschiavo
1921 births
2008 deaths
20th-century women lawyers